Scone railway station is a heritage-listed railway station located on the Main Northern line in Scone, in the Upper Hunter Shire local government area of New South Wales, Australia. The station serves the town of Scone and opened on 17 April 1871. The property was added to the New South Wales State Heritage Register on 2 April 1999.

Station configuration
The station has one platform and a passing loop. The original John Whitton 1871 brick building remains. In June 2014 the layout was reconfigured with the former loop becoming the main line and the platform line the loop.

The complex includes a type 4 brick second class station building, erected in 1871; a standard timber skillion roof type 3 signal box; and an outshed. Other structures include a brick platform face, completed in 1871; a jib crane; and a former goods loading facility.

Platforms & services
Scone is the terminating point for NSW TrainLink's Hunter Line services from Newcastle and a stopping point for NSW TrainLink Xplorer services from Sydney to Armidale and Moree.

The Hunter services were introduced by CityRail in September 1990.

Hunter line services usually terminate at the southern end of the platform which is slightly raised. Xplorers use the full platform.

There are three local services to/from Newcastle on weekdays, with two per day on weekends and public holidays.

Heritage listing 
Scone station is a fine mid-Victorian station building dating from the opening of the line. The building is well detailed and of fine proportion, it forms part of a group of buildings on that section of the line all that date from the opening of the line and which form a very important group of railway buildings in the state. The building also forms an important civic group in the town and contributes greatly to its character. The station is a focal point of the northern approach to the town.

Scone railway station was listed on the New South Wales State Heritage Register on 2 April 1999 having satisfied the following criteria.

The place possesses uncommon, rare or endangered aspects of the cultural or natural history of New South Wales.

This item is assessed as historically rare. This item is assessed as arch. rare. This item is assessed as socially rare.

See also

Notes

References

Bibliography

Attribution

External links

Scone station details Transport for New South Wales
2008 Scone Station ARTC Timetable

Easy Access railway stations in New South Wales
John Whitton railway stations
Railway stations in the Hunter Region
Railway stations in Australia opened in 1871
Regional railway stations in New South Wales
New South Wales State Heritage Register
Scone, New South Wales
Articles incorporating text from the New South Wales State Heritage Register
Main North railway line, New South Wales